Summer 1967: The Complete U.S. Concert Recordings is a four CD live set by the Monkees, recorded during the band's Summer 1967 tour. The CD was a limited edition release, with 3,500 copies being made available by Rhino Hand Made.

The tour began after the May release of the band's third album, Headquarters. The bulk of the material focused on their third album with their biggest singles from first and second album. There were also a quartet of cover songs with each of the Monkees choosing one.

Several of the tracks were compiled in 1987 and released as Live 1967.

The set list for each CD is identical, as the band performed the same group of songs in order at each show.
 CD 1: Municipal Auditorium, Mobile, Alabama - August 12, 1967 (mono)
 CD 2: Seattle Center Coliseum, Seattle, Washington - August 25, 1967 (stereo)
 CD 3: Memorial Coliseum, Portland, Oregon - August 26, 1967 (stereo)
 CD 4: The Coliseum, Spokane, Washington - August 27, 1967 (stereo)

Track listing
 "(Theme From) The Monkees" (Tommy Boyce and Bobby Hart)
 "Last Train to Clarksville" (Boyce and Hart)
 "You Just May Be the One" (Michael Nesmith)
 "The Girl I Knew Somewhere" (Nesmith)
 "I Wanna Be Free" (Boyce and Hart)
 "Sunny Girlfriend" (Nesmith)
 "Your Auntie Grizelda" (Diane Hildebrand and Jack Keller)
 "Forget That Girl" (Chip Douglas)
 "Sweet Young Thing" (Nesmith)
 "Mary, Mary" (Nesmith)
 "Cripple Creek" (Trad. Arrangement by Peter Tork)
 "You Can't Judge a Book By the Cover" (Willie Dixon)
 "Gonna Build a Mountain" (Anthony Newley and Leslie Bricusse)
 "I Got a Woman" (Ray Charles and Renald Richard)
 "I'm a Believer" (Neil Diamond)
 "Randy Scouse Git" (Micky Dolenz)
 "(I'm Not Your) Steppin' Stone" (Boyce and Hart)

References

The Monkees live albums
2001 live albums
2001 compilation albums
Rhino Handmade live albums
Rhino Handmade compilation albums